Starr Lake may refer to:

 Starr Lake (McMurdo Station), a small meltwater lake which is a source of water for McMurdo Station on Ross Island, Antarctica
 Starr Lake (Lac-Saint-Jean-Est), a freshwater body in the head area of the Moncouche River in Quebec, Canada